Kalat-e Bala may refer to:
 Kalat-e Bala, Hormozgan
 Kalat-e Bala, South Khorasan

See also
Kalateh-ye Bala (disambiguation)